Children in Love (traditional Chinese: 胡月; pinyin: Hú Yùe) is a Belgian-Taiwanese electronica music project founded by Pierre Hujoel in 2009 and including various musicians, among whom Taiwanese singers-songwriters 許雅捷 Ya-chieh Hsu and 孫博萱 Vicky Sun and Taiwanese drummer 郭逸萱 Yi-hsuan Kuo have played a recurring role.

Biography 
Pierre moved from Belgium to Taiwan after his music studies in order to learn Chinese and explore the island's multicultural background. He later started working as a film music composer, travelling back and forth between the two countries. He launched Children in Love on his own in 2009 and was joined by Ya-chieh in 2012, a Taiwanese singer and lyricist. For four years, the duo's music revolved around Ya-chieh's voice and Pierre's piano and electronic percussion, blending influences from the West and the East. They released their debut EP in 2014 under the name Western Moon and have been touring in Asia and in Europe ever since. In 2015, they started working with Taiwanese singer-songwriter Vicky Sun, and, in 2016, with classically-trained Taiwanese drummer Yi-hsuan Kuo, and released their first full album. They've also composed the soundtrack of several short films.

Discography 
 Debut (2014)
 Children in Love (Taiwan Ministry of Culture) (HighNote Records, StreetVoice) (2016)
 My World is Yours (StreetVoice) (2019)

References 

Electro (music)
Belgian music
Taiwanese music